George Jackson Meek (5 February 1934 – 16 March 2018) was a Scottish professional footballer who played as a winger. Active in both Scotland and England, Meek made nearly 400 league appearances in a career which lasted from 1951 to 1965, scoring nearly 50 goals.

Career
Born in Glasgow, Meek began his career with Junior side Thorniewood United. After turning professional in 1951, Meek played for Hamilton Academical, Leeds United, Walsall and Leicester City, before playing non-league football with Dudley Town.

He died on 16 March 2018, aged 84.

References

1934 births
2018 deaths
Scottish footballers
Hamilton Academical F.C. players
Leeds United F.C. players
Walsall F.C. players
Leicester City F.C. players
Dudley Town F.C. players
Scottish Football League players
English Football League players
Association football wingers
Footballers from Glasgow
Scottish Junior Football Association players